Mattheos Maroukakis (born 4 January 1990) is a Greek former professional footballer who played as a centre forward.

Early years
Maroukakis was born in Athens but was raised in Lemnos. He made his first football steps in the local amateur side Keravnos Agios Dimitrios. Unlike other children starting at an early age their involvement with football, he decided to begin in the age of 12! In the summer of 2007, aged 17, he went to Athens to study computer developing and started training with the youth squad of Kallithea in order not to completely lose contact with football, as a student. He started as a centre back but later he decided to play as a forward. A year later, on 1 July 2008, he signed a five-year professional contract and moved to the first squad.

Career
He played in Kallithea for almost 6 years making a total of 143 appearances and scored 35 goals. On 1 July 2013, he moved to Super League club Panionios where he had in fact minimum participation (his first out of 3 appearances was on 18 August 2013 against OFI in the Theodoros Vardinogiannis Stadium) so on 2 January 2014, he moved to Gamma Ethniki club Ionikos. In the summer of 2014 he moved to Patras based Football League club Panachaiki where he had a full season with 29 appearances and  11 goals. On 31 July 2015 he signed a three-year contract with AE Larissa where he had an excellent beginning scoring 7 goals in the first 8 league games. At the end of season, he celebrated the championship as the club promoted to Super League. On 31 December 2016, Maroukakis left the team by mutual agreement. On 2 January 2017 he joined Trikala. After only two months he terminated his contract stating personal problems.

On 9 September 2018, he joined Aittitos Spata, ahead of the 2018–19 season.

References

External links
 
Ποιος είναι ο Μαρουκάκης! 
aelole 
pamesports 
myplayer 

1990 births
Living people
Super League Greece players
Greek footballers
Kallithea F.C. players
Panionios F.C. players
Ionikos F.C. players
Panachaiki F.C. players
Athlitiki Enosi Larissa F.C. players
Trikala F.C. players
Association football forwards
People from Lemnos